Athy  (also known as Athy, the electric harper) (born 28 February 1984, Ituzaingó, Buenos Aires. Argentina) is a musician and composer who plays electric harp and Celtic harp.

Music career 

Athy's musical style contains romantic, flamenco, blues, Celtic and Arabic elements. Athy promotes harp music in Argentina. In 2007, Athy's second album Sabour a Tiershra was released. In 2011, he gave a concert and a master class at the Moscow Festival of the Celtic Harp АРФАVITA. He played Libertango by Astor Piazzolla. Athy's third album, Harp Seduction, was released in 2013. His professional persona is an irreverent neo-romantic with tattoos and body piercing. Athy carries his harp when he performs.

Athy has performed at the Teatro Colón, Buenos Aires, Centro Cultural Borges, La Casona del Teatro, La Casa del Poeta and Velma Café.
 In 2007, Athy participated in a television program about the harp, Instrumentos, (Canal (a) Argentina, 2007). In 2007, he also performed in Cosmopolitan Calendar 2007. He played his work, Lágrimas en la Oscuridad. In 2008, Camac Harps, France, sponsored Athy's performances. He was given an acoustic Celtic concert harp and two electric harps, called "Blue Light", made of carbon fiber.

In 2009 Athy performed for the UN in the city of Tigre, Argentina, at Recicl Arte, to promote environmentalism. He also performed at the 26th and 27th Rencontres internationales de harpe Celtique at Dinan, the Vale do Café festival, Vossauras, Brazil, the IV at the Rio Harp festival, Rio de Janeiro, Brazil, the Festival Interceltique de Lorient for Camac Harps' fortieth anniversary, the Great Evening of Celtic Harp, and a master class, the Celtic Music Festival Franco-Italian Celtica in 2010 and 2011, and represented Argentina at the 4th annual World Harp Festival in Asuncion, Paraguay in 2010. He also performed at the Château de Clisson and the Château de Châteaubriant. In 2009, Athy won a harp in the first Trophy Camac competition organized by Camac Harps of France, held in Courmayeur, Italy.

In 2011, Athy accompanied Project 12, the Dominic Graham's Celtic ballet in Northern Ireland (Portrush), in his ballet work, Entwined Hearts. He also concertised in Ireland and on 2 July 2012, Val Veny, Italy.

Athy has performed with The Chieftains, Cécile Corbel, Vincenzo Zitello, Carlos Núñez Muñoz, Antonio Olmos (guitar), Pamela Schweblin (Irish bagpipes and Irish whistles), Nicolas Cuadro (percussion), Javier Rondó (batería), Luz Yacianci (voz) Gustavo Echeverria (violin), Daniela Sigaud (violin), Celtic Argentina (Irish Dancing ), Marcela Cerruti (piano), Adrian Albornoz (electric bass), Nadia Birkenstock (electric harp), Clotilde Trouillaud (electric harp) and Aida Delfino (Celtic harp).

On 26 May 2012, Athy performed at the Festival International de la Harpe, held during the celebration of the 40th anniversary of Camac at Ancenis.

Other career 
Athy also works as a model. In 2008, he was employed in an advertising campaign for the Silhouette electric harp for Lyon & Healy, Chicago. 
 
Athy participated in the reality television show El Casting de la tele, Canal 13, Argentina. He finished as the semi-finalist.

Discography 
 2005 : Solas an Anama / Luz del Alma, Kisur Records, Argentine.
 2007 : Sabour a Tiershra; «Natural Way», Sonobook, Argentine.
 2013: Harp Seduction. "Freak Harp Music". Argentine.
 2014: Mo domhan draíochta: Mi Mágico Mundo. Fantasy tracks from "Luz del Alma","Sabour a Tiershra" and "Harp Seduction". "Freak Harp Music".. Argentine.

Titles of some compositions of Athy 

 Vals Feérico
 Lágrimas en la Oscuridad
 Nenúfar
 Mándalas de Piel
 Seres del Fuego
 Mi Hada del Bosque
 Nostalgia con Variaciones
 Misterios detrás del Espejo
 Fairy´s Heart – Cuando Danzan las Estrellas “Jig”
 Indigo Profundo
 Exile
 El Ultimo Unicornio Negro
 Alas del Alma
 Cobrizo Amanecer
 Cinnamon reel
 Un Erizo en la Noche
 The Dark Fig
 Mum in hurry in the kitchen
 Danzando en el Aire
 Plegaria
 Brisa del Valle
 Acuarius
 Entwinned Hearts, Composed for the Irish dance group of Dominic Graham.
 Cuchuflo´s Jig
 Luna de Marrakech
 Un Domingo en Maipú y Corrientes
 Dulce Bretaña,(Valse pour la Bretagne) Composed for the "Interceltique Festival de Lorient". 
 Magali
 Sunshine in Paris
 La resurrección del Fenix
 Atlantis
 Cuervos en la Noche
 Origami / The Resurrection of Japan Composed in honour of the victims of the tsunami in Japan.
 The Blue Harp Set
 Ruperto´s Crazy Night
 First love
 Esperando a Soléne
 Lazos de Cristal
 Delfina´s Aura
 El lamento de la Mandolina
 Entre la Oscuridad
 Los Encantados Cisnes de Lir
 Renacer Celeste
 Sueña en una Estrella
 Cobrizo Amanecer
 Harper´s March
 Lamento judío
 Si tengo el Cabello Azul… Y que?!!
 Fuerte como el Roble...

Harp (or Piano) Sheet music 

 2012: Dulce Bretaña, Freak Harp Music. Creighton's Collection
 2012: Seres del Fuego, Freak Harp Music. Creighton's Collection
 2012: Libertango (Astor Piazzolla, Arr. for Electric Harp), Freak Harp Music. Creighton's Collection
 2013: Cuchuflo´s Jig, Freak Harp Music. Creighton's Collection
 2013:  Atlantis. Freak Harp Music. Creighton's Collection
 2013: Perfume a Tango. Freak Harp Music. Creighton's Collection
 2013: Varikset yössä. "Cuervos en la Noche". Rhapsody for Electric Harp. Freak Harp Music. Creighton's Collection
 2013: Du'n Geimhin · Entwined Hearts. For Lever Harp, Pedal Harp or Piano. Freak Harp Music. Creighton's Collection
 2014: Origami 折り紙. For Lever Harp, Pedal Harp or Piano. Freak Harp Music. Creighton's Collection.

Videoclips 
 2013: ORIGAMI 折り紙. (Harp Seduction) Directed by Nicolás Ravagnan. "Los Imaginarios"
 2013: PERFUME A TANGO. (Harp Seduction) Directed by Nicolás Ravagnan. "Los Imaginarios"
 2013: DULCE BRETAÑA (Valse pour la Bretagna). Produced by Cat Studio.
 2013: THE PHOENIX RESURECTION. Directed by Nicolás Ravagnan.

Instruments 
 Electro 36 Mirror Black Finish, Les harpes Camac, France.
 DHC Blue LightPurple Metal Flakes & Gold, Les harpes Camac, France.

References

See also 
 Interview with Athy 2003 (es)
 "El Artista punk", Clase ejecutiva, El Cronista commercial, Argentina, 2012.
 Athy, artista y compositor contemporáneo, en arperia.com 
 Weblog de l'artiste 

1984 births
Living people
Argentine harpists
Argentine composers
People from Ituzaingó Partido